This is a list of rides, attractions and themes from Six Flags Great America that no longer operate in the park.

Rides and attractions

Former roller coasters

Former flat rides

Show venues

Themed areas

References

Lists of former amusement park attractions